The 1947–48 international cricket season was from September 1947 to April 1948.

Season overview

November

India in Australia

January

England in the West Indies

March

Fiji in New Zealand

Australia in Ceylon

April

India in Ceylon

References

International cricket competitions by season
1947 in cricket
1948 in cricket